Albert Medal may refer to:
 Albert Medal for Lifesaving, awarded for lifesaving
 Albert Medal (Royal Society of Arts), awarded by the Royal Society of Arts